Senator Bowles may refer to:

Evelyn M. Bowles (1921–2016), Illinois State Senate
Skipper Bowles (1919–1986), North Carolina State Senate